Pratkowice  is a village in the administrative district of Gmina Wielgomłyny, with in Radomsko County, Łódź Voivodeship, in central Poland.

References

Pratkowice